Siklós is a district in southern part of Baranya County, Hungary. Siklós is also the name of the town where the district seat is found. The district is located in the Southern Transdanubia Statistical Region.

Geography 
Siklós District borders with Pécs District and Bóly District to the north, Mohács District to the east, the Croatian county of Osijek-Baranja to the south, Sellye District to the west. The number of the inhabited places in Siklós District is 53.

Municipalities 
The district has 3 towns, 1 large village and 49 villages.
(ordered by population, as of 1 January 2012)

The bolded municipalities are cities, italics municipality is large village.

See also
List of cities and towns in Hungary

References

External links
 Postal codes of the Siklós District

Districts in Baranya County